4 ft 8 in gauge railways are railways with a track gauge of . This gauge is  less than  The first such railways were the Killingworth Railway and the Stockton and Darlington Railway

Similar gauges 
 The Huddersfield Corporation Tramways, the gauge is  less than 
 The Glasgow Corporation Tramways, 
 The Washington Metro , the gauge is  less than 
 The trams in Nuremberg for one time nominally used , the gauge is  less than 
 The MTR uses  on most lines.
 The Bucharest Metro uses

Railways

See also 
 4 ft 7 3⁄4 in gauge 
 List of 4 ft 8 in gauge railways
 List of track gauges
 List of tram track gauges

Notes

References

Sources